The Bell X-16 was a high altitude aerial reconnaissance jet aircraft designed in the United States in the 1950s. The designation of X-16 was a cover to try to hide the true nature of the aircraft mission from the Soviet Union during the Cold War.

Development
During the second half of 1953, Fairchild, Bell, and Martin Aircraft conducted high altitude reconnaissance aircraft design studies for the United States Air Force under project MX-2147. All three designs used Pratt & Whitney J57-19 turbojets. The Bell and Martin (B-57D) designs were chosen for further development. The Bell Model 67 design was designated the X-16. A full-scale mock-up was completed and one aircraft was partially completed. It was designed as a high altitude long-range reconnaissance aircraft.

The X-16 design was breaking new ground with its design. Its wing was long  with a high (11.9) aspect ratio. The structure was significantly lighter and more flexible than usual for jet aircraft wings.

A total of 28 aircraft were ordered, but none were completed. The first X-16 was about 80 percent complete when the program was cancelled by the Air Force in favor of the Martin RB-57 in 1956. Although no X-16 was ever completed, it made contributions to aircraft design with its lightweight design. It was also a driving force behind the development of the high-altitude versions of the J57 that would later power the Lockheed U-2 and other aircraft.

Specifications (X-16, as designed)

See also

References
Notes

Bibliography

 Jenkins, Dennis R., Tony Landis and Jay Miller. American X-Vehicles: An Inventory – X-1 to X-50 (Monographs in Aerospace History No. 31: Centennial of Flight Edition). Washington, D.C.: NASA SP-2003-4531, June 2003. Retrieved: 26 July 2009.
 Miller, Jay. Lockheed Martin's Skunk Works: The Official History.  Leicester, UK: Aerofax, an imprint of Midland Publishing, 1995 (revised edition). .
 Polmar, Martin. Spyplane: The U-2 History. St. Paul, Minnesota: Zenith Press, 2001. .

External links
 X-16 at globalsecurity.org

X-16, Bell
X-16
Cancelled military aircraft projects of the United States